Bjarne Anders Strand (born 8 November 1946) is a Norwegian alpine skier. He was born in Oppdal. He participated at the 1968 Winter Olympics in Grenoble, where he competed in downhill, slalom and giant slalom.

He became Norwegian champion in downhill in 1966, and in slalom in 1968.

References

External links

1946 births
Living people
People from Sør-Trøndelag
People from Oppdal
Norwegian male alpine skiers
Olympic alpine skiers of Norway
Alpine skiers at the 1968 Winter Olympics
Sportspeople from Trøndelag